The 2011 European Rowing Championships were the fifth edition of the European Rowing Championships, since they were reinstated by decision of FISA in 2006. The event was held in Plovdiv, Bulgaria, between 16 and 18 September 2011. A total of 389 rowers (254 men and 135 women), representing 28 national federations, took part in 14 events – eight events less than those contested in the previous edition.

Medal summary

Men

Women

Medal table

References

External links
 
 Results

2011 in rowing
2011
International sports competitions hosted by Bulgaria
Sport in Plovdiv
Rowing
2011 in European sport
Rowing competitions in Bulgaria